This list of climbers and mountaineers is a list of people notable for the activities of mountaineering, rock climbing (including lead climbing, bouldering, speed climbing and competition climbing) and ice climbing (including mixed climbing).

A 

 Vitaly Abalakov (1906–1992) Russia, climbed Lenin Peak (1934) and Khan Tengri (1936)
 Yevgeniy Abalakov (1907–1948) Russia, climbed Communism Peak (1933)
 Premlata Agarwal (born 1963) India, first Indian woman to complete all Seven Summits
 H. P. S. Ahluwalia (fl. 1965) India, climbed Mount Everest in 1965
 Pierre Allain (1904–2000) France, championed bouldering at Fontainebleau, and inventor of rubber rock-climbing shoes
 Christian Almer (1826–1898) Switzerland, numerous first ascents, including Eiger
 Ashraf Aman (born 1943) Pakistan, first Pakistani ascent of K2
 Luigi Amedeo, Duke of Abruzzi (1873–1933) Italy, first ascent of Mount Saint Elias of the Rwenzori Mountains
 Pat Ament (born 1946) US, rock climber and pioneer boulderer
 Melchior Anderegg (1827–1912) Switzerland, guide, with numerous first ascents, including new routes on Mont Blanc
 Conrad Anker (born 1963) US, discovered Mallory's body on Everest in 1999
 Tyler Armstrong (born 2004) US, in 2013, at age 9, the youngest to climb Aconcagua
 Melissa Arnot (born 1983) US, six ascents of Everest
 Bernd Arnold (born 1947) Germany, more than 900 first ascents in Saxon Switzerland
 Armando Aste (1926–2017) Italy, first Italian ascent of Eiger north face
 Peter Athans (born 1957) US, seven ascents of Mount Everest
 Peter Aufschnaiter (1899–1973) Austria, mountaineer and companion of Heinrich Harrer (as described in Seven Years in Tibet)
 Abdul Jabbar Bhatti, Pakistani mountaineer and the former military officer of the Pakistan Army

B 

 Samina Baig - Gilgit-Baltistan, 3rd Pakistani and only Pakistani woman to climb Mount Everest
 John Bachar (1957–2009) US, noted for climbs in Yosemite National Park and free soloing
 John Ball (1818–1889) Ireland, naturalist and climber, Alps guidebooks author, first president of Alpine Club in 1857
 Jacques Balmat (1762–1834) Duchy of Savoy, Chamonix-based guide, first ascent Mont Blanc (1786)
 George Band (1929–2011) UK, Everest expedition (1953), first ascent on 1955 British Kangchenjunga expedition
 Kinga Baranowska (born 1975), Poland, first Polish woman to have climbed Dhaulagiri, Manaslu and Kangchenjunga
 Anna Barańska (born 1976) Poland, first Polish woman on the North Face of Mount Everest
 Henry Barber (born 1953) US, leading US rock climber in the 1970s
 Andrzej Bargiel Current record holder in speed to get Snow Leopard award and current record holder Elbrus Race
 Lilliane and Maurice Barrard (1948–1986 and 1941?–1986 respectively) France, Gasherbrum II (1982), Nanga Parbat (1984, first female ascent), both killed on K2
 Charles Barrington (1834–1901) UK, first ascent Eiger (1858)
 Richard Bass (1929–2015) US, businessman and amateur mountaineer, first to complete Seven Summits (1985)
 Robert Hicks Bates (1911–2007) US, first ascent Mount Lucania (1937), on US attempts on K2 (1938 and 1953)
 Mark Beaufoy (1764–1827) UK, fourth ascent Mont Blanc (1787)
 Fred Beckey (Friedrich Wolfgang Beckey) (1923-2017) Germany/US, many first ascents in US and Canada
 Bentley Beetham (1886–1963) UK, on 1924 Everest expedition; pioneer of Borrowdale (Lake District) rock climbing
 George Irving Bell (1926–2000) US, physicist, biologist and mountaineer, first ascent Masherbrum (1960), rescued on K2 (1953)
 Gertrude Bell (1868–1926) UK, many ascents in Alps and further afield
 Maciej Berbeka (1954–2013) first winter ascents of eight-thousanders: Manaslu, Cho Oyu, Broad Peak
 Patrick Berhault (1957–2004) France, many ascents in the Alps.
 Didier Berthod Switzerland, featured in First Ascent
 Adam Bielecki (born 1983) first winter ascents of eight-thousanders: Gasherbrum I and Broad Peak
John Biggar (born 1964) Scottish mountaineer who has made various first ascents in the Andes
 Isabella Bird (1831–1904) UK, traveller, writer and natural historian
 Barry Blanchard (born 1959) Canada, mountain guide; first ascents in the Saint Elias range of Alaska
 Smoke Blanchard (1915–1989) US, developed Buttermilk bouldering area
 Karl Blodig (1859–1956) Austria, mountaineer, optician and journalist; first to climb all 4,000 metres peaks in the Alps
 Arlene Blum (born 1945) US, first US female attempt on Everest, led first all-woman ascent of Annapurna
 Peter Boardman (1950–1982) UK, Everest 1975, Changabang West Wall 1976, Kanchenjunga 1979, died on Everest with Joe Tasker
 Emmanuel Boileau de Castelnau (1857–1923) France, first ascent La Meije with father and son Pierre Gaspard (1877)
 Jean-Marc Boivin (1951–1990) France, exponent of extreme ascents and descents
 Walter Bonatti (1930–2011) Italy, mountaineer and writer, solo new routes on Aiguille du Dru and Matterhorn
 Sir Chris Bonington (born 1934) UK, first ascent Central Pillar of Freney (1961), Annapurna II (1960), Nuptse (1961), Central Tower of Paine (1962–3), ascent of Everest (1985)
 Thomas George Bonney (1833–1923) UK, geologist and mountaineer, president of Alpine Club
Jack Borgenicht (1911-2005), USA,  garment manufacturer, philanthropist, the oldest person to climb Mount Rainier at age 81
 Alastair Borthwick (1913–2003) Scotland, climber and author of Always a Little Further
 Christine Boskoff (1967–2006) US, 6 8,000m summits, including Everest twice, died on Genyen Peak
 Sébastien Bouin (born 1993) France, first ascent of Suprême Jumbo Love (2022), and DNA (2022), the world's second-ever  route
 Anatoli Boukreev (1958–1997) Russia, climbed seven 8,000 m peaks without supplemental oxygen, died on Annapurna 1997
 Loulou Boulaz (1908–1991) Switzerland, several first ascents and first female ascents in the Alps
 Tom Bourdillon (1924–1956) UK, Cho Oyu (1952), British Everest expeditions (1951, 1952 and 1953), South Summit of Everest (1953), died on the Jägihorn
 Stipe Božić (born 1951) FPR Yugoslavia, completed Seven Summits, second European to climb Everest twice
 Lydia Bradey (born 1961) New Zealand, first woman to climb Mt Everest without oxygen 1988
 Samuel Brawand (1898–2001) Switzerland, politician and mountain guide; first ascent of Mittellegigrat (northeast ridge of Eiger) (1921)
 David Breashears (born 1956) US, Everest twice, directed IMAX film Everest
 Meta Brevoort (1825–1876) US, alpinist of Victorian period, aunt of W. A. B. Coolidge
 Russell Brice (born 1952) New Zealand, record for fastest single solo ascent without oxygen of Cho Oyu and Ama Dablam
 Jim Bridwell (1944–2018) US, rock climber, first one-day ascent of Nose of El Capitan in 1975
 David Brower (1912–2000) US, Executive Director of Sierra Club and Yosemite climber
 Joe Brown (1930-2020) UK, rock climber, first ascent Aiguille de Blaitière west face, Kanchenjunga (1955), Mustagh Tower
 Katie Brown (born 1981) US, won 1995 X Games and climbing Junior World Cup
 Geoffrey Bruce (1896–1972) UK, in 1922 reached  on Everest (then a world record) on his first mountain climb.
 Hermann Buhl (1924–1957) Austria, first ascent Nanga Parbat (1953) and Broad Peak (1957), died on Chogolisa
 Alexander Burgener (1845–1910) Switzerland, first ascent Matterhorn Zmuttgrat, Grands Charmoz, Aiguille du Grépon, Lenzspitze, Grand Dru
 Jean Buridan (c. 1300–1358) France, climbed Mont Ventoux for the view, before Petrarch

C 

 Tommy Caldwell (born 1978) US, rock climber, free climbed the Dawn Wall on El Capitan
 Una Cameron (1904–1987) UK, ascents in Alps, Caucasus and Africa
 Louis Ramond de Carbonnières (1755–1827) France, scientist and Pyrenean pioneer
 Kim Carrigan (born 1958) Australia, leading technical rock climber of the 1980s
 Carlos Carsolio (born 1962) Mexico, 14 8,000m summits (1985–1996)
 Riccardo Cassin (1909–2009) Italy, first ascent Piz Badile north-east face (1937); Grandes Jorasses Walker Spur (1938); Mount McKinley Cassin Ridge (1961)
 Cristina Castagna (1977–2009) Italy, first Italian female ascent Makalu
 Alison Chadwick-Onyszkiewicz (1942–1978) Britain, first ascent Gasherbrum III
 Ludwik Chałubiński (1860–1933) Poland, first ascent Mięguszowiecki Szczyt Wielki
 Armand Charlet (1900–1975) France, many first ascents in Mont Blanc massif
 Isabella Charlet-Straton (1838–1918) UK, first ascents in Alps, first winter ascent Mont Blanc (1876)
 Maxime Chaya (born 1961) Lebanon, Everest (2006), Seven Summits and Three Poles Challenge
 Chhurim (born 1984) Nepal, first woman to reach Everest summit twice in a week
 Renata Chlumska (born 1973) Sweden, first Swedish female ascent Everest (1999)
 Yvon Chouinard (born 1938) US, pioneer of Yosemite climbing, founder of Chouinard Equipment and Patagonia
 Leszek Cichy (born 1951) Poland, first winter ascent Everest
 John Clarke (1945–2003) Canada, explorer and wilderness educator, over 600 first ascents in Coast Range of British Columbia
 Vern Clevenger (born 1955) US, first ascent Cholatse (1982), numerous first routes ascents in Sierra Nevada
 Ian Clough (1939–1970) UK, first ascent Am Buachaille (1968), first UK ascent Eiger north face (1962), died on Annapurna
 Norman Clyde (1886–1972) US, pioneer of California's Sierra Nevada
 Johann Coaz (1822–1918) Switzerland, first ascent of Piz Bernina
 J. Norman Collie (1859–1942) UK, first ascent Ben Nevis Tower Ridge, Nanga Parbat expedition (1895)
 Emilio Comici (1901–1940) Italy, first ascent Cima Grande di Lavaredo north face (1933) with Angelo and Giuseppe Dimai, died in accident in Val Gardena
 Achille Compagnoni (1914–2009) Italy, first ascent K2 (1954) with Lino Lacedelli
Kyra Condie (born 1996) US, member of the 2020 US Olympic climbing team
 Herb and Jan Conn (Herb: 1921–2012) US, early pioneers of climbing in areas like Carderock in Maryland, Seneca Rocks in West Virginia, and Black Hills of South Dakota
 William Martin Conway (1856–1937) UK, surveyor and explorer (Karakoram, Spitsbergen, Andes & Alps)
 Kenton Cool (born 1973) UK, sixteen-time Everest summiter
 W. A. B. Coolidge (1850–1926) US, 1,700 expeditions in Alps, Alpine historian
 Janne Corax (born 1967) Sweden, adventurer and climber
 Henri Cordier (1856–1877) France, first ascents Aiguille du Plat de la Selle, Les Droites (east summit) (1876) died in accident on Le Plaret
 Patrick Cordier (1947–1996) France, first ascent French Direct on Norway's Troll Wall (1967), solo ascent The Nose, Yosemite (1973), first ascents in Mont Blanc massif
 Jean Couzy (1923–1958) France, first ascent Makalu with Terray on the 1955 French Makalu expedition
 Lucy Creamer (born 1971) British champion climber
 Peter Croft (born 1958) Canada, many hard first ascents in the Sierra Nevada
 Aleister Crowley (1875–1947) UK, occultist, writer, and rock climber, led early expeditions on K2 and Kanchenjunga
 Michel Croz (1830–1865) France, numerous first ascents, died on descent after first ascent of Matterhorn
 John Cunningham (1927–1980) Scotland, pioneered new techniques of ice climbing
 Bronisław Czech (1908–1944) Poland, a mountain rescue pioneer in the Tatra Mountains
 Anna Czerwińska (born 1949) Poland, oldest female ascent Everest (at the time, age 50), first Polish female Seven Summits
 Andrzej Czok (1948–1986), Poland first winter ascent of Dhaulagiri and first ascent of Mount Everest through South Pillar

D 

 Kalpana Dash (born 1966) India, first from Odisha, India to climb Mount Everest (2008)
Sophia Danenberg (born 1972) US, first African American and first black woman to ascend Mount Everest
 Steph Davis (born 1973) US, second female one-day free climb El Capitan
 Johnny Dawes (born 1964) UK, a rock climber, introduced two new grades in British grading system
 José Antonio Delgado (1965–2006) Venezuela, five 8,000m summits (1994–2006), died on Nanga Parbat
 Clinton Thomas Dent (1850–1912) UK, Caucasus, Alps, first ascent Lenzspitze (1870), Aiguille du Dru (1878)
 Ardito Desio (1897–2001) Italy, geologist and mountaineer, leader of K2 first-ascent expeditionbonatt (1954)
 Catherine Destivelle (born 1960) France, first woman to solo the Eiger North Face in winter
 Kurt Diemberger (born 1932) Austria, first ascent Broad Peak (1957) and Dhaulagiri (1960), climbed K2 (1986 K2 disaster)
 Sasha DiGiulian (born 1992) US, first woman to free climb Magic Mushroom, Eiger
 Jan Długosz (1929–1962) Poland, a mountaineer who was part of the first ascent of the Central Pillar of Frêney on Mont Blanc 
 Jim Donini (1943) US, first ascent of Torre Egger, noted mountaineer
 Hans Christian Doseth (1958–1984) Norway, climbed Great Trango Tower east face (1984), died during descent
 Lord Francis Douglas (1847–1865) Scotland, died on the descent after the first ascent of Matterhorn
 Lonnie Dupre (born 1961) US, Solo climb of Denali in winter
 Hans Dülfer (1892–1915) Germany, rock climber killed in World War I
 Hayatullah Khan Durrani (born 1962) Pakistan, mountaineer, and rock climber
 Günther Dyhrenfurth (1886–1975) Germany/Switzerland, Himalayan explorer, led German expeditions to Kanchenjunga (1930, 1931)

E 
 James Eccles (1838–1915) UK, first ascents in Mont Blanc massif
 Oscar Eckenstein (1859–1921) UK, alpinist, rock climber and boulderer
 Patrick Edlinger (1960–2012) France, award-winning rock climber, featured in several rock climbing movies
 Angela Eiter (born 1986), Austria, first woman in history to climb a 9b (5.15b) route (La Planta de Shiva at Villanueva del Rosario, Spain)
 Albert R. Ellingwood (22 June 1887 – 12 May 1934) pioneer of Colorado climbing: La Plata Peak Ellingwood Ridge, Ellingwood Ledges on Crestone Needle, Lizard Head, and Teton climbs
 Zsolt Erőss (1968–2013) Hungary, ten eight-thousanders, two with prosthetic leg, died on descent from Kangchenjunga summit
 Susan Ershler (born 1956) US, first married couple to climb the Seven Summits, together (with Phil Ershler)
 Leila Esfandyari (1970–2011) Iran, first Iranian woman to climb Nanga Parbat; died on Gasherbrum II
 Jens Esmark (1763–1839) Norway, first ascent Snøhetta (1798) and Mount Gaustatoppen, led first expedition to Bitihorn
 Nick Estcourt (1942–1978) UK, killed on K2 by avalanche
 Charles Evans (1918–1995) UK, Alps, Wales, leader of Kangchenjunga first ascent 1955 British Kangchenjunga expedition
 John Ewbank (1948–2013) Australia, pioneer of Australian rock climbing, invented Australian (Ewbank) grading system

F 

 Freda du Faur (1882–1935) Australia, first female ascent of Aoraki / Mount Cook
 Ron Fawcett (born 1955) UK, one of the first professional rock climbers
 Sue Fear (1963–2006) Australia, five 8,000ers, killed in crevasse fall on Manaslu
 Rudolf Fehrmann (1886–1947) Germany, pioneer rock climber in Elbsandsteingebirge
 Darby Field (1610–1649) Ireland?, first European to climb Mount Washington (New Hampshire) (1642)
 George Ingle Finch (1888–1970) Australia, reached 8,300 m on 1922 Everest expedition; Dent d'Hérens north face
 Hazel Findlay (born 1989) UK, first British woman to climb E9
 Scott Fischer (1955–1996) US, Lhotse 1990, K2 1992, Everest 1994; died in 1996 Mount Everest disaster
 Hans Florine (born 1964) US, speed climber, ascent The Nose El Capitan (2012) in 2:36:45
 James David Forbes (1809–1868) UK, first British ascent Jungfrau
 Charlie Fowler (1954–2006) US, free solo rock climber and high-altitude mountaineer
 Mick Fowler (born 1956) UK, explorer and mountaineer, winner of three Piolet d'Ors (2003, 2013, 2016)
 Douglas Freshfield (1845–1934) UK, Alps, Scotland, Himalayas, Pyrenees
 Tom Frost US, rock climber, first ascents of big walls in Yosemite Valley
 Fritiof Fryxell (1900-1986) US, geologist and park ranger, first ascents in the Teton Range
 Wang Fuzhou (1935–2015) China, first ascent Everest north face, first ascent Shishapangma

G 

 Patrick Gabarrou (born 1951) France, first ascents in Mont Blanc massif
 Will Gadd (born 1967) Canada, various hard mixed routes including the first M12
 Ryszard Gajewski (born 1954) Poland, first winter ascent of Manaslu
 Lene Gammelgaard Denmark, author of Climbing High, first female Scandinavian ascent of Everest
 João Garcia (born 1967) Portugal, first Portuguese to climb Everest and all the 14 8,000mt summits without supplementary oxygen (1993–2010)
 Rolando Garibotti (born 1971) Argentina/US, Fitz Roy, Cerro Torre traverse
 Janja Garnbret (born 1999) Slovenia, one of the most successful competition climbers in history.  
 Pierre Gaspard (1834–1915) France, first ascent La Meije with his son and Emmanuel Boileau de Castelnau
 Chanda Gayen (1979–2014) India, the first woman from West Bengal to climb Everest, killed on Kanchenjunga western side
 Lakpa Gelu (born 1967) Nepal, 12 Everest ascents
 Lester Germer (1896–1971) US, physicist, World War I fighter pilot and rock climber
 Conrad Gessner (1516–1565) Switzerland, naturalist and early mountaineer in the Alps
 Azim Gheychisaz (born 1981), Iranian mountain climber who climbed all 14 Eight-thousanders
 John Gill (born 1937) US, father of modern bouldering, introduced chalk and modern dynamics in the 1950s
 Stefan Glowacz (born 1965) Germany, professional rock climber
 Alessandro Gogna (born 1946) Italy, mountaineer, adventurer and mountain guide from
 Dan Goodwin (born 1955) US, rock/building climber, climbed World Trade Center, Sears Tower, John Hancock Center and CN Tower
 Dave Graham (born 1981) US, rock climber and boulderer
 Tormod Granheim (born 1974) Norway, climber and extreme skier, first ski descent Everest north face (2006)
 Chloé Graftiaux (1987–2010) Belgium, rock and sport climber and mountaineer
 William Spotswood Green (1847–1919) New Zealand, Selkirks
 Paul Grohmann (1838–1908) Austria, numerous first ascents in the 19th century
 Michael Groom (born 1959) Australia, ascents of Lhotse, Kangchenjunga, K2, and Everest without bottled oxygen
 Bear Grylls (born 1974) in 1998, at age 23, was the youngest Briton to summit Mount Everest
 Wolfgang Güllich (1960–1992) Germany, rock climber (including free solo climber), first  with Action Directe (1991)
 Paul Güssfeldt (1840–1920) Germany, first ascent Peuterey ridge and Piz Scerscen, first European attempt on Aconcagua (1883)
 Veikka Gustafsson (born 1968) Finland, all 8,000m summits (1993–2009)

H 

 Peter Habeler (born 1942) Austria, first ascent without supplementary oxygen Everest (1978) with Reinhold Messner
 Douglas Robert Hadow (1846–1865) UK, died on first ascent Matterhorn (1865)
 Dave Hahn - US, 11 Everest ascents, 26 Vinson Massif ascents, 19 Denali ascents
 Artur Hajzer (1962–2013) Poland, first winter ascent of Annapurna with Jerzy Kukuczka (1987)
 Lincoln Hall (1956–2012) Australia, rescued at 8,700m on descent from Everest (2006)
 Rob Hall (1960–1996) New Zealand, Seven Summits in seven months, died in 1996 Mount Everest disaster
 Peter Harding (1924–2007) UK, prominent climber of the 1940s
 Warren J. Harding (1924–2002) first ascent El Capitan
 Alison Hargreaves (1963–1995) UK, first female unassisted Everest (1995), died on descent from K2 summit
 John Harlin (1934–1966) US, direct route pioneer, killed on Eiger north face
 Heinrich Harrer (1912–2006) Austria, first ascent Eiger north face (1938) and Carstensz Pyramid (1962), author of Seven Years in Tibet
 Brette Harrington (born 1992) US, first free solo of Chiaro di Luna (5.11a), Patagonia
 Ginette Harrison (1958–1999) UK, Seven Summits, first female ascent Kangchenjunga (1998), killed on Dhaulagiri
 Dougal Haston (1940–1977) Scotland, first ascent Annapurna south face (1970), killed in avalanche near Leysin
 Elizabeth Hawkins-Whitshed (1860–1934) UK, pioneer of mountaineering, mountain photographer, author
 Margo Hayes (born 1998), US, first woman to climb 5.15a (La Rambla, Spain)
 Andreas Heckmair (1906–2005) Germany, first ascent Eiger north face (1938)
 Zygmunt Andrzej Heinrich (1937–1989) Poland, several eight-thousander ascents
 Gary Hemming (1934–1969) US, first ascent south face Aiguille du Fou
 Siegfried Herford (1891–1916) UK, first ascent Scafell Central Buttress (1914)
 Derek Hersey (1956–1993) UK, many free solo routes in the US
 Maurice Herzog (1919–2012) France, led 1950 French Annapurna expedition (first 8,000m peak climbed)
 Tom Higgins (1944–2018) US, first and first free ascents in US, also in France outside Chamonix
 Lynn Hill (born 1961) US, first free ascent The Nose on El Capitan, Yosemite (1993)
 Sandy Hill (born 1955) US, Seven Summits
 Edmund Hillary (1919–2008) New Zealand, first ascent Everest (1953) with Tenzing Norgay
 Alan Hinkes OBE (born 1954) UK, first Briton to climb all 8,000m summits (claim is disputed)
 Andreas Hinterstoisser (1914–1936) Germany, attempted Eiger north face in 1936 with Toni Kurz, both died during the retreat
 Yuji Hirayama (born 1969) Japan, World Champion 1998, 2000
 Marty Hoey (1951–1982) US, died on Everest
 Charles F. Hoffmann (1838–1913) US, surveyor and mountaineer, several first ascents in Sierra Nevada
 Jim Holloway (born 1954) US, perhaps first to achieve V11+ levels
 Alex Honnold (born 1985) US, free solo of Half Dome northwest face (2008), Moonlight Buttress in Zion National Park (2008), and Freerider on El Capitan (2017)
 Tom Hornbein (born 1930) US, first ascent Everest west ridge (1963)
 Steve House (born 1970) US, solo ascent K7 (2004), first ascent Nanga Parbat Rupal face (2005)
 Charles Houston (1913–2009) US, first ascent Mount Foraker (1934), attempts on K2 in 1938, 1953
 Alexander and Thomas Huber (born 1968 and 1966 respectively) Germany, free ascents Yosemite, speed record El Capitan
 Charles Hudson (1828–1865) UK, first ascent Monte Rosa (1855), Matterhorn (1865), died on descent of Matterhorn
 Tomaž Humar (1969–2009) Slovenia, Piolet d'Or (1996) for new route Ama Dablam, solo Dhaulagiri south wall
 Alexander von Humboldt (1769–1859) Germany, Chimborazo
 John Hunt (1910–1998) UK, leader, 1953 Everest expedition

I 
 Marcel Ichac (1906–1994) France, filmed first French expedition in Himalaya Karakoram (1936) and 1950 French Annapurna expedition
 Dimitar Ilievski (1953–1989) Macedonia, first Macedonian to climb Everest, died on the way back
 Ulrich Inderbinen (1900–2004) Switzerland, guide, 371 Matterhorn ascents, the last at 90 years old
 Alberto Iñurrategi (born 1968) Basque, Spain, youngest person to climb all eight-thousanders (33 years old) (4th without supplemental oxygen)
 Andrew Irvine (1902–1924) UK, died on Everest with George Mallory (1924)
 R. L. G. Irving (1877–1969) UK, Alpine pedagogue and author

J 

 John Jackson (1921–2005) UK, first ascent of Jackson's Route
 Margaret Jackson (1843–1906) UK, pioneer female mountaineer in the Alps
 Nicolas Jaeger (1946–1980) France, first French ascent of Mount Everest
 Ray Jardine  (born 1944) US, inventor of "Friends" protection for rock climbing
 Tim Jarvis (born 1966) Australia/UK, re-created Shackleton's South Georgia traverse
 Narendra Dhar Jayal a.k.a. 'Nandu' Jayal (died 1958) India, first Director of Himalayan Institute of Mountaineering
 Ganesh Jena (born 1972) India, first male from Odisha, India to climb Mount Everest
 Jimmy Jewell (1953–1987) UK, prolific rock-climbing soloist
 Konstanty Jodko-Narkiewicz (1901–1963) Polish, mountaineer
 Alex Johnson (born 1989) US, five-time United States national champion and two-time Bouldering World Cup gold medalist
 Raghav Joneja (born 1997) India, youngest Indian to climb Mount Everest
 Kevin Jorgeson (born 1984) US, first free climb of the Dawn Wall of El Capitan in Yosemite National Park, US

K 

 Meherban Karim (1979–2008) Pakistan, Gasherbrum II, Nanga Parbat, and K2 (all three without supplementary oxygen), died on descent of K2
Conrad Kain (1883–1934) Austria/Canada, over 50 first ascents in the Canadian Rockies including Mount Robson
 Gerlinde Kaltenbrunner  (born 1970) Austria, the first woman to climb all 14 eight-thousanders without supplemental oxygen
 Bob Kamps (1931–2005) US, pioneer of the golden age of Yosemite climbing and 5.10 and 5.11 routes in America
 Harish Kapadia (born 1945) India, Himalayan veteran
 Fritz Kasparek (1910–1954) Austria, first ascent of Eiger north face
 Peter Kaufmann (1858–1924) Switzerland, guide in Alps and Canadian Rockies
 Ron Kauk (born 1957) US, rock climber, many first ascents in Yosemite, stunt work for climbing movies
 Robert Kayen (born 1959) US, rock climber, professor, scientist, first solo ascent of West Buttress of El Capitan
 Dora Keen (1871–1963) US, ascents in Alps, member of Royal Geographical Society, 1914
 Alexander Kellas (1868–1921) UK, altitude record in 1911 on summit of Pauhunri (7,128 m)
 Pat Kelly (died 1922) UK, rock climber and founder of Pinnacle Club
 E. S. Kennedy (1817–1898) UK, first ascent Monte Disgrazia, Mont Blanc du Tacul
 Mikhail Khergiani (1932-1969), Svan mountaineer of Soviet Georgia, known as the Tiger of the Rocks
 Clarence King (1842–1901) US, geologist and climber, first director of USGS, first ascent Mount Tyndall
 Andy Kirkpatrick (born 1971) UK, rock and ice climber
 Colin Kirkus (1910–1942) UK, rock climber and alpinist
 Christian Klucker (1853–1928) Switzerland, guide, prolific first ascensionist in Bernina Range and Bregaglia
 M.S. Kohli (born 1931) India, leader of the Indian Everest expedition (1965)
 Layton Kor (1938–2013) US, rock climber and mountaineer, author of Beyond the Vertical
 Dai Koyamada (born 1976) Japan, sport climber and boulderer
 Jon Krakauer (born 1954) US, author and mountaineer, Everest (1996)
 Hans Kraus (1905–1995) Austria, rock climber, sports medicine and physical medicine and rehabilitation pioneer
 Göran Kropp (1966–2002) Sweden, cycled a bike from Sweden to Everest, soloed Everest without oxygen, and then cycled home (1996)
 Moriz von Kuffner (1854–1939) Austria, first ascents including Eiger north-east face and Mount Maudit's Kuffner Ridge 
 Julius Kugy (1858–1944) Austria-Slovenia, father of modern mountaineering in the Julian Alps
 Jerzy Kukuczka (1948–1989) Poland, the second man to climb all 8,000m peaks (9 new routes), four eight-thousanders in winter, only person to climb  two eight-thousanders in one winter
 Colonel Narendra Kumar (1933–2020) India, Siachen Glacier and Himalayan veteran
 Jaan Künnap (born 1948) Estonia, mountaineer, and photographer
 Janusz Kurczab (1937–2015) Poland, led 1976 Polish unsuccessful expedition to tackle the northeast ridge of K2
 Wojciech Kurtyka (born 1947) Poland, pioneer of alpine style in high mountains
 Toni Kurz (1913–1936) Germany, attempted Eiger north face in 1936, died during retreat

L 
 Constantin Lăcătușu (born 1961) Romania
 Lino Lacedelli (1925–2009) Italy, first ascent K2 (1954) with Achille Compagnoni
 Louis Lachenal (1921–1955) France, first ascent of Annapurna 1950, with Maurice Herzog; died skiing in Chamonix
 Jean-Christophe Lafaille (1965–2006) France, 11 eight-thousanders without supplementary oxygen; died on Makalu
 David Lama (1990–2019) Austria, climber and alpinist, notable for first free ascent of Cerro Torre
 Raymond Lambert (1914–1997) Switzerland, reached 8611m, highest altitude at that time, with 1952 Swiss Everest expedition
 Samantha Larson (born 1988) US, youngest person to complete Seven Summits, at 18 in 2007
 Marc-André Leclerc (1992-2018) Canada, First winter solo ascents of the Torre Egger in Patagonia and the Emperor Face of Mount Robson
 Philip Ling (fl. 2006) Australia, notable for one of the highest rescues, of two injured Sherpas on Mt. Pumori (7167m), Nepal
 Pete Livesey (1943–1998) UK, influential rock climber in the 1970s
 John Long (born 1953) US, rock climber and writer; author of  How to Rock Climb series
 Erhard Loretan (1959–2011) Switzerland, 14 8,000m-plus summits (1982–1995)
 Alex Lowe (1958–1999) US, climbed Great Trango Tower, Rakekniven in Antarctica and Sail Peak on Baffin Island; died on Shishapangma
 George Lowe (1924–2013) New Zealand, last surviving member of 1953 British Mount Everest Expedition
 Jeff Lowe (1950-2018) US, made over 1000 first ascents in the US and Canadian Rockies, Alps and Himalayas
 Fritz Luchsinger (1921–1983) Switzerland, first ascent of Lhotse, in 1956

M 

 Meherban Karim (1979–2008) Pakistan, Gasherbrum II, Nanga Parbat, K2 without supplementary oxygen
Ashish Mane (born 1990) India, Everest (2012), Lhotse (2013), Makalu (2014), Manaslu (2017)
 Tim Macartney-Snape (born 1956) Australia, Everest (1984), first to climb Everest from sea level (1990)
 Dave MacLeod (born 1978) Scotland, made the first free ascent of the world's first E11 traditional climbing route
 M. Magendran (born 1963) Malaysia, Everest (1997), first Malaysian/Tamil to reach the summit
 Nasuh Mahruki (born 1968) Turkey, Snow Leopard, first Turkish and Muslim climber of Everest
 Janusz Majer (born September 25, 1946) Poland
 Maki Yūkō (1894–1989) Japan, first ascents of Mittellegigrat (Eiger northeast ridge), Mount Alberta; first winter ascent of Mount Yari; led Manaslu first ascent
 Tashi and Nungshi Malik (born 1991) India, many world first female twins records 
 George Mallory (1886–1924) UK, initial 1921 British Reconnaissance Expedition and the 1922 and 1924 British Mount Everest expeditions, died on Everest at 8,150+ metres
 Sergio Martini (born 1949) Italy, seventh ascent of all eight-thousanders (1983–2000)
 Marie Marvingt (1875–1963) France, first woman to climb most major peaks in the French and Swiss Alps (1903–7)
 William Mathews (1828–1901) UK, founder of Alpine Club, first ascent Monte Viso, Grande Casse
 Chantal Mauduit (1964–1998) France, six 8,000m summits without supplementary oxygen, died on Dhaulagiri
 John Oakley Maund (died 1902) UK, first ascents in Mont Blanc massif
 Eylem Elif Maviş (born 1973) Turkey, first Turkish female ascent of Everest (2006)
 Pierre Mazeaud (born 1929) France, Walter Bonatti's climbing partner, first French ascent of Everest (1978)
 Daniel Mazur (born 1960) US, numerous ascents in the Himalayas and America
 Steve McClure (born 1970) UK, first Briton to climb 9a twice
 Duncan McDuffie (1877–1951) US, summits in the Sierra Nevada
 Richard "Dick" McGowan (1933–2007) US, first US successful ascent of Everest, International Himalayan Expedition (1955)
 Ammon McNeely (born 1970) US, noteworthy first one-day ascents and speed records on El Capitan, Yosemite and Zion big walls
 Alex Megos (born 1993), first climber to on-sight 5.14d/9a route
 Alain Mesili (born 1949) France, disputed ascent on Fitz Roy (1970) with Ricardo Arzela, pioneered routes in Bolivia
 Reinhold Messner (born 1944) Italy, first to climb all eight-thousanders (1970–1986) and without supplementary oxygen, first ascent without supplementary oxygen of Everest with Peter Habeler (1978), first solo Everest (1980)
 John Middendorf (born 1959) US, big-wall rock climber, first ascent East Wall Great Trango Tower (1992)
 Thomas Middlemore (1842–1923) UK, first ascents in Mont Blanc and Bernina massifs, and Bernese Alps
 Gwen Moffat (born 1924) UK, author of Space Below My Feet (1961)
 Jerry Moffatt (born 1963) UK, sport climber and boulderer
 Silvio Mondinelli (born 1968) Italy, 13th to climb all eight-thousanders (sixth without supplementary oxygen)
 Ben Moon (born 1966) UK, sport climber, and boulderer, world's first  with Hubble
 A. W. Moore (1841–1887) UK, first ascent Fiescherhorn, Barre des Écrins, Piz Roseg, Ober Gabelhorn
 Tyrhee Moore US, member of the first all-African-American team to climb Denali
 Fritz Moravec (1922–1997) Austria, first ascent Gasherbrum II (1956)
 Piotr Morawski (1976–2009) Poland, many 8000m summits, died on Dhaulagiri/Manasu expedition
 Nea Morin (1905–1986) UK, rock climber and mountain climber
 Simone Moro (born 1967) Italy, first winter ascents of Shishapangma, Makalu, Gasherbrum II, and Nanga Parbat 
 Don Morrison (1929–1977) UK, pioneer of Alpine Style, first ascents in Canada, England, and Himalayas
 Patrick Morrow (born 1952) Canada, first to complete both Bass and Messner Seven Summits lists (1986)
 Tomáš Mrázek (born 1982) Czechoslovakia, rock climber, World Champion 2003, 2005, winner of World Cup 2004
 John Muir (1838–1914) Scottish-born US conservationist and mountaineer, summits in California and Alaska
 Norrie Muir (1948–2019) Scotland, prolific winter first ascentionist in Scotland
 Albert F. Mummery (1855–1895) UK, Alpine and Himalayan pioneer, killed on Nanga Parbat
 Don Munday (1890–1950) Canada, mountaineer and explorer, husband of Phyllis Munday, explored region around Mount Waddington
 Phyllis Munday (1894–1990) Canada, mountaineer and explorer, explored region around Mount Waddington
 Malli Mastan Babu (1974–2015) India, mountaineer and explorer, world record in completing seven summits in 172 days

N 

 Yasuko Namba (1949–1996) Japan, oldest woman at the time to climb Everest at 47 (1996), died on descent
 Wasfia Nazreen (born 1982) Bangladesh, motivational speaker and the second Bangladeshi woman to climb Everest (2012)
 Vitor Negrete (1967–2006) Brazil, first Brazilian to climb Mount Everest without supplementary oxygen
 Hilaree Nelson (born 1972) United States, first female to summit two 8000-meter peaks in one 24 hour push (2012). First ski descent Lhotse Couloir from the summit (2018)
 Fred Nicole Switzerland, numerous first ascents of sport routes and boulders
 Jamling Tenzing Norgay (born 1965) Nepal, son of Tenzing Norgay, climbed Everest with Edmund Hillary's son, Peter Hillary (2003)
 Tenzing Norgay (1914–1986) Sherpa, first ascent Everest (1953) with Edmund Hillary
 Edward F. Norton (1884–1954) leader of 1924 British Mount Everest Expedition with Mallory and Irvine
 Sue Nott (1969–2006) US, ice climber and first American woman to climb the Eiger north face in winter (2003)
 Wilfrid Noyce (1917–1962) UK, on Everest expedition (1953), reaching South Col, killed in Pamirs (1962)
 Arne Næss (1912–2009) Norway, philosopher and mountaineer, leader of expedition on first ascent Tirich Mir (1950)
 Arne Næss jr. (1937–2004) Norway, leader, Norwegian Everest expedition (1985)

O 

 Vanessa O'Brien (born 1964) First British-American woman to summit K2
 Cathy O'Dowd (born 1968) South Africa, first female ascent of Everest from both north and south (1999), fourth female ascent Lhotse (2000)
 Oh Eun-Sun (born 1966) South Korea, first Korean woman to climb Seven Summits, controversy over eight-thousanders claim
 Juanito Oiarzabal (born 1956) Basque (Spain), all eight-thousanders without supplementary oxygen, record 24 ascents of eight-thousanders
 Clare O'Leary (born 1972) Ireland, first Irish woman to climb Mount Everest (2004)
 Adam Ondra (born 1993) Czech Republic, first to redpoint a 9c 
 Dan Osman (1963–1998) US, rock climber, soloist, killed whilst attempting his new sport of rope jumping
 James Outram (1864–1925) Canada, first ascent of Mount Assiniboine

P 

 Michel-Gabriel Paccard (1757–1827) France, first ascent Mont Blanc (1786)
 Bachendri Pal (born 1954) first Indian female ascent (and fifth female ascent) Everest
 Tsewang Paljor (1968–1996) India, died on Everest in 1996 Mount Everest disaster
 Ines Papert (born 1974) German ice climber, apinist and author
 Marie Paradis  (1757–1827) France, first female ascent Mont Blanc (1809)
 Young-seok Park (1963–2011) South Korea, first true Explorers Grand Slam (2005), died on Annapurna
 Elizabeth Parker (1856–1944) Canada, journalist and mountaineer
 Chris Webb Parsons (born 1985) England/Australia, rock climber and boulderer
 Edurne Pasaban (born 1973) Basque, Spain, first woman to climb all eight-thousanders
 Pasang Lhamu Sherpa (1961–1993) first Nepali woman to summit Everest, died on descent (1993)
 Tom Patey (1932–1970) UK, first ascent Muztagh Tower (1956), Am Buachaille (1968), killed in abseiling accident, author of One Man's Mountains
 Krushnaa Patil (born 1989) India, second youngest Indian girl to climb Mount Everest
 Maciej Pawlikowski (born 1951) Poland, first winter ascent of Cho Oyu
 Ryszard Pawłowski
 Julius Payer (1841–1915) Czech-Austrian polar explorer who made many first ascents in the Adamello and Ortler mountains in the 1860s
 Annie Smith Peck (1850–1935) US, mountaineer
 William Penhall (1858–1882) UK, first ascent Matterhorn west face
 Carla Perez Ecuadorian climber, first Latin American female to ascend mount Everest with no supplemental oxygen
 Jim Perrin (born 1947) UK, over 200 first/free ascents in Britain
 Oliver Perry-Smith (1884–1969) US, a rock climber in Saxon Switzerland and the Dolomites
 Petrarch (1304–1374) Italy, climbed Mont Ventoux (1336)
 Elfrida Pigou (1911–1960) Canadian female climber, discovered crash site of Trans-Canada Air Lines Flight 810, died on Mount Waddington
 Tadeusz Piotrowski mountaineer
 Burçak Özoğlu Poçan (born 1970) Turkey, first Turkish female over 8,000 m (2005)
 Klára Poláčková (born 1978) first Czech female to ascent Everest
 Dean Potter (1972–2015) US, speed soloed El Cap in 4:17; speed soloed El Cap and Half Dome in one day
 Paul Preuss (1886–1913) Austria, an early promoter of free climbing, climbed 1200 peaks in his short life
 Marko Prezelj, Slovenian mountaineer and winner of 4 Piolet d'Ors (1992, 2007, 2015, 2016)
 Paul Pritchard (born 1967) UK, rock climber
 Hristo Prodanov (1943–1984) Bulgaria, soloed Lhotse (1981) and Everest (1984), died on the descent
 Bonnie Prudden (1914–2011) pioneering US rock climber and exercise advocate, 30 documented first ascents in the Gunks
 Karl Prusik (1896–1961) Austria, introduced widely used Prusik knot
 Ramón Julián Puigblanque (born 1981) Spain, rock climber
 Nirmal Purja (born 1982) Nepal, first to climb all fourteen 8000 meter mountains in one season (6 months, 6 days, with supplemental oxygen)
 Ludwig Purtscheller (1849–1900) first ascent Kilimanjaro (1889)
 Piotr Pustelnik (born 1951) Poland, 20th person to climb all 14 eight thousanders
 Boyan Petrov (born 1973) Bulgaria, climbed 10 out of 14 eight-thousanders, all without supplementary oxygen

R 

Brooke Raboutou (born 2001) US, member of the 2020 American Olympic climbing team
Aron Ralston (born 1975) US, gained fame after amputating his right arm to free himself after a canyoneering incident
 Lisa Rands (born 1975) US, rock climber and boulderer
 Michael Reardon (1974–2007) US, freesoloist and film producer
 Dave Rearick (born 1934) US, rock climber, first ascent of Diamond on Longs Peak (1960)
 Gaston Rébuffat (1921–1985) France, 1950 Annapurna expedition, first to climb all six great north faces of the Alps, Alpine guide and author
 Ernst Reiss (1920–2010) Swiss, first ascent of Lhotse (1956)
Monique Richard (born 1975) Canada, first woman to solo climb Mount Logan, first Canadian woman to summit Mt Makalu, Seven Summits in 32 months
 Dorothy Pilley Richards (1894–1986) UK, wrote Climbing Days (1935)
 Katharine Richardson (1854–1927) UK, mountaineer in the Alps in the 1880s
 Rick Ridgeway (born 1950) US, author, filmmaker, photographer, member of first American team to summit K2
 Leni Riefenstahl (1902–2003) Germany, filmmaker, actress and mountaineer
 Ang Rita (1948–2020) Sherpa, climbed Everest ten times without supplemental oxygen
 Royal Robbins (1935–2017) US, rock climber, pioneer of modern Yosemite climbing in the 1950s
 Alain Robert (born 1962) France, climber and builderer
 David Roberts US, author, first ascents of Wickersham Wall (Mount McKinley) and other Alaskan peaks
 Paul Robinson (born 1987) US, rock climber and boulderer
 André Roch (1906–2002) Switzerland, Everest 1952 attempt, many first ascents in Alps and Asia
 Beth Rodden (born 1980) US, rock climber and first-ever female to match the highest male grades in traditional climbing with Meltdown 
 Jordan Romero (born 1996) US, became the youngest person to climb Everest on May 22, 2010, aged 13 years, 10 months, 10 days
 Steve Roper guidebook writer, editor of Ascent, first ascent of West Butress of El Capitan.
 John Roskelley (born 1948) US, author, alpinist, Himalayan climber notable for technical first ascents of 7000 and 8000 m peaks
 Fred Rouhling (born 1970) France, rock climber, notable for the world's fourth  rock climb (and first in France), and the controversy over Akira
 Alan Rouse (1951–1986) UK, soloed many of hardest routes of day, died on descent from K2 (1986)
 Galen Rowell (1940–2002) US, photographer and mountaineer, first one-day ascents of Denali and Kilimanjaro, first ascent Great Trango Tower
 Henry Russell (1834–1909) France/Ireland, prolific first ascentionist in Pyrenees
 Wanda Rutkiewicz (1943–1992) Poland, first woman on K2, 8,000m-peak veteran, died attempting Kanchenjunga

S 

 Nazir Sabir Gilgit-Baltistan Pakistan, first Pakistani to climb Mount Everest
 Hassan Sadpara (born 1963) Gilgit-Baltistan Pakistan, starting as a high altitude porter, he climbed 5xPakistani 8000ers and Everest, without supplementary oxygen
 Mostafa Salameh (born 1970) Jordan, first Jordanian to summit Everest, and Seven Summits
 John Salathé (1900–1993) Switzerland/US, pioneering Yosemite National Park, inventor of modern piton
 Horace-Bénédict de Saussure (1740–1799) France, third ascent Mont Blanc (1787), funded first ascent
 Marcus Schmuck (1925–2005) Austria, first ascent Broad Peak, first ascent Skil Brum
 Peter Schoening (1927–2004) US, first ascent Gasherbrum I and Vinson Massif, saved five climbers on K2 (1953)
 Jakob Schubert (1990) Austria, one of the most successful competition climbers in history
 Doug Scott (1941–2020) UK, Seven Summits, first ascent Everest south-west face, Baintha Brakk (descent with broken ankles), Kangchenjunga, Nuptse
 Vittorio Sella (1859–1943) Italy, mountaineer and pioneer photographer
 John Sherman (born 1959) US, inventor of "V" grading system
 Apa Sherpa (born early 1960s) Nepal, record for most ascents of Everest (20 as of 2010)
 Pasang Lhamu Sherpa (1961–1993) Nepal, first Nepali woman to climb Everest, died during descent
 Pemba Doma Sherpa (1970–2007) Nepal, first Nepali female mountaineer to climb Everest north face, died on Lhotse
 Pemba Dorjie Sherpa Nepal, fastest ascent of Everest (2003)
 Eric Shipton (1907–1977) UK, first ascent Kamet, pioneered route across the Khumbu Glacier
 Ashima Shiraishi (born 2001) US, first female to climb V15 (Horizon, Mount Hiei, Japan)
 William Shockley (1910–1989) US, Nobel Prize-winning physicist, proponent of eugenics, first ascent Shockleys Ceiling in the Gunks (1953)
 Joe Simpson (born 1960) UK, survived a fall on Siula Grande, wrote Touching the Void
 Arunima Sinha India, first Indian amputee to climb Everest
 Todd Skinner (1958–2006) US, rock climber, first free ascent Salathe Wall, died on Leaning Tower
 Cecilie Skog (born 1974) Norway, first female to climb Seven Summits and both Poles, Everest and K2
 Laurie Skreslet (born 1949) Canada, first Canadian to summit Everest (1982)
 William Cecil Slingsby (1849–1929) UK, first ascent Store Skagastølstind (1876), pioneer of Norwegian mountaineering
 Frank Smythe (1900–1949) UK, first ascent Kamet (1931) with Shipton, R. Holdsworth and Lewa Sherpa, reached 8565m on Everest in 1933 without supplementary oxygen
 Dermot Somers Ireland, climber, author and broadcaster
 Carlos Soria Fontán (born 1939) Spain, the only mountaineer to have ascended nine mountains of more than 8,000 meters after turning 60 years old
 Jaahnavi Sriperambuduru (born 2001) India.
 William Grant Stairs (1863–1892) Canada, first non-African to climb in the Ruwenzoris
 Allen Steck (born 1926) US, mountaineer and rock climber
 Ueli Steck (1976–2017) Switzerland, soloed Eiger north face in 2:22:50 hours (2015)
 Leslie Stephen (1832–1904) UK, author and alpinist, first ascent Schreckhorn, Monte Disgrazia, Zinalrothorn
 Fritz Steuri (1879–1950) Switzerland, skier and mountain guide; first ascent of Mittellegigrat (northeast ridge of Eiger) (1921)
 Edward Lisle Strutt (1874–1948) UK, deputy leader on 1922 Everest expedition, outspoken Alpine Journal editor, 1927–37
 Gottlieb Samuel Studer (1804–1890) Switzerland, first ascent Wildhorn (1843), founding member of Swiss Alpine Club
 Satyarup Siddhanta (born 1983) India, climbed Mont Blanc, climbed 6 of the 7 summits, climbed Mt Everest on 21 May 2016

T 

 Junko Tabei (1939–2016) Japan, first female ascent Everest; first completion of Bass and Messner's Seven Summits
 Kei Taniguchi (1972–2015) Japan, first female winner of the Piolet d'Or in 2009
 Joe Tasker (1948–1982) UK, Dunagiri, Kanchenjunga, Changabang West Wall; died on Everest (May 1982)
 Asma Al Thani first Qatari woman to ascend Everest and Ama Dablam; first Arab to summit an eight-thousander without oxygen
 Vernon Tejas (born 1953) US, first solo winter ascent Denali, Seven Summits time world record
 Lionel Terray (1921–1965) France, first ascents Fitz Roy, Chakrarahu, Jannu and Makalu on the 1955 French Makalu expedition; second ascent Eiger north face (1947)
 Vladislav Terzyul (1953–2004) Ukraine, disputed claim to have climbed all eight-thousanders
 Kevin Thaw (born 1967) UK, ascents in Himalayas and Yosemite
 Herbert Tichy (1912–1987) Austrian, first ascent Cho Oyu (1954)
 Bill Tilman (1898–1977) UK, explorer, climbed in Africa and Himalaya, first ascent Nanda Devi (1936)
 Luis Trenker (1892–1990) Italy, mountaineer, film director and writer
 Sonnie Trotter (born 1979) Canada, award-winning climber, known for hard trad climbing
 Francis Fox Tuckett (1834–1913) UK, first ascent Aletschhorn (1859)
 Julie Tullis (1939–1986) UK, Broad Peak (1984) and K2 (1986); died on descent from K2
 Mark Twight (born 1962) US, advocate of "light and fast" style of mountaineering
 John Tyndall (1820–1893) UK, early attempts on Matterhorn, first ascent Weisshorn (1861)

U 

 Naomi Uemura (1941–1984) Japan, first solo winter ascent Mount McKinley, on which he died
 James Ramsey Ullman (1908–1971) US, author and mountaineer
 Ugur Uluocak (1962–2003) Turkey, mountaineer, photographer and editor, died on Mount Alarcha in Kyrgyzstan
 Um Hong-Gil (born 1960) South Korea, 9th person to climb all eight-thousanders, first to climb 16 highest peaks
 Willi Unsoeld (1926–1979) US, first ascent Everest west ridge (1963), died on Mount Rainier (1979)
 Karl Unterkircher (1970–2008) Italy, Everest and K2 in the same year without oxygen, died on Nanga Parbat
 Denis Urubko (born 1973) Kazakhstan, 14x8000er; first winter ascents of Makalu and Gasherbrum II, Snow Leopard award winner

V 

 Arjun Vajpai (born 1993) India, climbed Everest 2010, Lhotse 2011 and Manaslu 2011
 Ivan Vallejo (born 1959) Ecuador, 14th person to climb all eight-thousanders (7th without supplemental oxygen)
 Patrick Vallençant (1946–1989) France, alpinist/skier and ski mountaineering pioneer
 Anak Verhoeven (born 1996) Belgium, first woman to claim a first ascent of a 5.15a
Allison Vest (born 1995) Canada, two-time Canadian Bouldering Nationals champion
 Ed Viesturs (born 1959) US, first US climber to climb all eight-thousander (6th without supplemental oxygen)
 Sibusiso Vilane (born 1970) South Africa, first black African to summit Everest (2003)
 Ludwig Vörg (1911–1941) Germany, first ascent Eiger north face (1938)

W 

 Horace Walker (1838–1908) UK, first ascent Mount Elbrus, Grandes Jorasses, Barre des Ecrins, Obergabelhorn
 Lucy Walker (1836–1916) UK, first female ascent Matterhorn (1871)
 Barbara Washburn US, first ascent Mount Bertha, first female ascent Denali (1947)
 Bradford Washburn (1910–2007) US, third ascent Denali, pioneered west buttress route
 Ryan Waters (born 1973) US, first American to complete the Adventurers Grand Slam with unsupported north and south poles
 Don Whillans (1933–1985) UK, first ascent Annapurna south face (1970)
 Rick White (1946–2004) Australia, rock climber, developed Frog Buttress (1968)
 Jim Whittaker (born 1929) US, first US ascent Everest (1963)
 Lou Whittaker (born 1929) US, Rainier guide
 Edward Whymper (1840–1911) UK, first ascent Matterhorn (1865), first ascent Chimborazo (1880)
 Jim Wickwire (born 1940) US, K2 (1978) (bivouacked near summit)
 Krzysztof Wielicki (born 1950) Poland, first winter ascent Everest; fifth person to climb all eight-thousanders
 Karl Wien (1906–1937) Germany, leader of unsuccessful Nanga Parbat expedition (1937)
 Fritz Wiessner (1900–1988) US, born Dresden, emigrated to US; pioneer of free climbing; K2 expedition (1939)
Sydney Wignall (1922-2012) UK, Climbed Gurla Mandhata in 1955
 Walter Wilcox (1869–1949) Canadian Rockies explorer

 Martyn S. Williams A mountain and wilderness guide who is the first person in the world to lead expeditions to the three extremes, South Pole (1989) North Pole (1992) and Everest (1991).

 Richard Williams - rock climber, pioneered many first ascents in the Shawangunks and author of rock climbing books
 George Willig (born 1949) US, climbed South Tower of World Trade Center
 Fritz Wintersteller (1927–2018) Austria, first ascent Broad Peak (1957) and Skil Brum (1957)
 Ian Woodall (born 1956) UK, climbed Everest several times
 Daniel Woods (born 1989) American climber who specialises in bouldering, ascended the world's hardest boulder problem, Flash (V15) in 2011
 Fanny Bullock Workman (1859–1925) US, geographer, cartographer and mountaineer, notably in the Himalayas

Y 
 Santosh Yadav (born 1969) India, Indo-Tibetan Border Police woman, climbed Everest twice (1992 and 1993)
 Simon Yates (born 1963) UK, Joe Simpson's partner on west face of Siula Grande (1985), subject of Touching the Void
 Michael J. Ybarra (1966–2012) US, climber and writer, extreme sports correspondent for The Wall Street Journal 2007–2012
 Wang Yongfeng (born 1963) China, first Chinese couple to climb Seven Summits (with Li Zhixin)
 Ichiro Yoshizawa (1903–1998) Japan, climber and writer; K2 (1977)
 Geoffrey Winthrop Young (1876–1958) UK, first ascent Täschhorn south face, Weisshorn west ridge, Grandes Jorasses traverse

Z 

 Andrzej Zawada (1928–2000) Poland, pioneer of winter Himalayism
 Li Zhixin (born 1962) China, half of first Chinese couple to climb the Seven Summits with Wang Yongfeng
 Emil Zsigmondy (1861–1885) Austria, physician and mountain climber; died trying to force new route on the Meije
 Jerzy Żuławski (1874–1915) Polish literary figure, philosopher, translator and alpinist
 Juliusz Żuławski (1910–1999) Polish poet, prose writer, literary critic, translator and climber; son of Jerzy Żuławski
 Marek Żuławski (1908–1985) Polish painter, graphic artist, author and climber; son of Jerzy Żuławski
 Wawrzyniec Żuławski (1916–1957) Polish composer, music critic and teacher; died during Mont Blanc rescue mission; son of Jerzy Żuławski
 Matthias Zurbriggen (1856–1917) Switzerland, first ascent Aconcagua (1897)

See also 

List of 20th-century summiters of Mount Everest

References

External links 
 Mountaineering Who's Who

 
Climbers and mountaineers